Jeaustin Campos Madriz (born June 30, 1971) is a Costa Rican football manager and retired player. He is currently the manager for Saprissa.

Club career
He was one of the most famous Costa Rican soccer midfielders during the 1990s and played most of his career with Deportivo Saprissa, where he won four national championships and two CONCACAF Champions Cup, in 1993 and 1995. He scored a total of 40 goals for Saprissa. He also played for Municipal Pérez Zeledón and FC Seoul of the South Korean K League 1, then known as LG Cheetahs, whom he joined when his father Luis Gerardo Campos was the Costa Rican consul in South Korea.

International career
Campos made his debut for Costa Rica in a September 1997 FIFA World Cup qualification match against the USA and collected a total of 20 caps, scoring no goals. He has represented his country in 5 FIFA World Cup qualification matches and played at the 1999 UNCAF Nations Cup as well as at the 2000 CONCACAF Gold Cup.

His final international was a January 2001 FIFA World Cup qualification match against Guatemala.

Managerial career
After retiring from professional football, Campos was appointed as Football Operations Manager in Saprissa, during the years that Hernán Medford was head coach, and played a very important role in the achievements accomplished by Saprissa during that period, such as 2 national tournaments, the Uncaf Cup and the CONCACAF Champions Cup, giving them the right to compete in the second FIFA Club World Championship Toyota Cup in Japan, in December 2005, in which Saprissa finished third.
When Medford and his coaching staff were announced by the Federación Costarricense de Fútbol as the new coaches for the Costa Rica national football team, Campos was named by Saprissa as their new head coach and has since then, against all expectations, led his team to win both legs of the 2007-2008 Championship earning it the Champion title without the need of a final.

Later he led the squad to 3 more consecutive national championships (make it fourth in a row) in the years 2007-2008. He was fired in November 2009. In February 2010, he signed with 2009 Puerto Rico Soccer League Champions Bayamón to help the club qualify for the CONCACAF Champions League. Later he became manager of Pérez Zeledón and in August 2011, he was appointed head Coach for the Puerto Rico national football team. He is also activating and assuming charge of the U-15, U-17 and U-20 selections despite still being contracted to Pérez Zeledón who went to FIFA to claim a financial compensation.

In January 2014 Campos was named sporting director at Saprissa and in September 2014 replaced manager Rónald González to take charge of the team.

References

External links
 
 
 
 

1971 births
Living people
People from Pérez Zeledón (canton)
Association football midfielders
Costa Rican footballers
Costa Rica international footballers
2000 CONCACAF Gold Cup players
Municipal Pérez Zeledón footballers
Deportivo Saprissa players
FC Seoul players
K League 1 players
Costa Rican expatriate footballers
Expatriate footballers in South Korea
Costa Rican expatriate sportspeople in Puerto Rico
Costa Rican expatriate sportspeople in South Korea
Costa Rican expatriate sportspeople in Bolivia
Costa Rican football managers
Expatriate football managers in Puerto Rico
Expatriate football managers in Bolivia
Deportivo Saprissa non-playing staff
Puerto Rico national football team managers
Copa Centroamericana-winning players
Deportivo Saprissa managers
Club Blooming managers
Nacional Potosí managers
C.S. Herediano managers